Evgeni Nikiforov (born 20 March 1993) is a Russian professional ice hockey forward who currently plays for HC Donbass of the Kontinental Hockey League.

References

External links

1993 births
Living people
Russian ice hockey right wingers
Sportspeople from Ufa
HC Donbass players